Zasavica II, also known as Donja Zasavica,  is a village in the Sremska Mitrovica municipality, in the Vojvodina province of Serbia. The village has a Serb ethnic majority and its population numbering 608 people (2011 census). Although part of the Srem District, Zasavica II is situated in the region of Mačva south of the Sava river.  With the adjacent village of Zasavica I (Gornja Zasavica), it still forms a single cadastral unit, although they are treated as separate villages for census purposes.

Historical population

1981: 767
1991: 750
2002: 707
2011: 608

See also
List of places in Serbia
List of cities, towns and villages in Vojvodina

References

External links 

Municipality of Sremska Mitrovica

Populated places in Vojvodina
Sremska Mitrovica
Mačva